Robert IV may refer to:

 Robert IV the Strong (820 – July 2, 866)
 Robert IV de Sablé (Grand Master of the Knights Templar from 1191 to 1193 and Lord of Cyprus from 1191 to 1192, died on 23 September 1193)
 Robert de Beaumont, 4th Earl of Leicester (died )
 Robert de Brus, 4th Lord of Annandale ( – 1226–1233)
 Robert IV, Count of Nassau (died )
 Robert IV, Count of Dreux (1241–1282)
 Robert IV of Artois, Count of Eu (1356 – July 20, 1387)
 Robert IV de la Marck (15 January 1512 – 4 November 1556)